Elton Çeno (born 19 June 1976) is an Albanian retired football player.

External links
 Fussball Transfers profile

1976 births
Living people
Albanian footballers
Association football midfielders
KF Elbasani players
KS Shkumbini Peqin players
FC Steaua București players
KF Teuta Durrës players
KS Egnatia Rrogozhinë players
KS Lushnja players
KF Gramshi players
Liga I players
Albanian expatriate footballers
Expatriate footballers in Romania
Albanian expatriate sportspeople in Romania